The Dave Gallaher Trophy is a rugby union trophy contested between  and . It is named after Dave Gallaher, the 1905–06 All Black captain who was killed in Belgium during World War I.

History

When it comes to rugby, France and New Zealand have a very rich common history. France played their first ever test match in 1906 against the famous "Originals" New Zealand team, on their way home after an eventful tour of the British Isles.

Between 1906 and 1999 both teams met a total of 34 times, New Zealand winning 25 times and France 9, including two games in the Rugby World Cup with New Zealand winning the 1987 final and France taking their revenge in the semi-final 12 years later in what remains one of the most famous upsets in the sport's history.

In 2000 it was decided that a new trophy would be created to emphasize the two teams' great rivalry. The trophy would be named after Dave Gallaher, the charismatic captain of the 1906 New Zealand team, who died 11 years later during the Battle of Broodseinde in World War I.

Challenges and defences

The Dave Gallaher Trophy is based on a challenge system, the holding union must defend the trophy in challenge matches, and if the other union defeats them, they become the new holder of the trophy. If both teams draw then the holder retains the trophy. 

Rugby World Cup games between both teams - such as the 2003 RWC 3rd place play-off won by New Zealand or the 2007 RWC quarter final won by France and 2011 RWC final won by NZL - do not qualify as challenge matches.

France won the 2009 challenge 37–36 on aggregate score over two matches, having won the first test 27–22 and lost the second 10–14. The New Zealand team had assumed the series would be drawn if each team won one test, and were upset to discover that aggregate was taken into account, which their coaching staff had deliberately withheld from them.

New Zealand would retain the trophy for 12 years until being defeated 40–25 by France in Paris.

Matches

Results
 – Summer Test
 – Autumn International

Other trophies

The All Blacks compete with three other nations for the attribution of a similar kind of trophy.  The Bledisloe Cup, versus Australia, being the most famous. The other two are the Freedom Cup against South Africa and the Hillary Shield against England.

As for France, they compete with Australia for the Trophée des Bicentenaires and with Italy for the Garibaldi Trophy.

Notes and references

External links
The Dave Gallaher Trophy results

Rugby union international rivalry trophies
International rugby union competitions hosted by France
International rugby union competitions hosted by New Zealand
History of rugby union matches between France and New Zealand
2000 establishments in France
2000 establishments in New Zealand